Hydnocarpus pentandrus is a medium-sized tree in the family Achariaceae. This dioecious tree grows up to 10m height, in moist deciduous forests of Western Ghats in India.

Description 
Hydnocarpus pentandrus is a medium-sized evergreen tree. Bark is pale brown, mottled  with occasional white patches.

Leaves - Simple, alternate, and stipulate. Base obtuse and apex acuminate. Margins crenate serrate or entire.

Flowers- unisexual, greenish yellow, sepals - 5, petals - 5, stamens - 5 to 15

Fruits - Woody berry, 5–7 cm across, brown, rough with uneven surface

Seeds - Numerous, yellowish

References 

pentandrus